Bud Plays Bird  is a studio album by the jazz pianist Bud Powell, recorded late 1957/early 1958 for Roulette, but unreleased until 1997, when it was rediscovered by Michael Cuscuna and released by Blue Note (under the Roulette label) as part of The Blue Note Collection.

Track listing 
All songs were written by Charlie Parker, except where noted.
 "Big Foot" [long version] (aka "Drifting on a Reed") – 6:24
 "Shaw 'Nuff" (Charlie Parker, Dizzy Gillespie) – 4:10
 "Buzzy" – 4:02
 "Yardbird Suite" – 4:04
 "Relaxin' at Camarillo" – 4:27
 "Confirmation" – 5:50
 "Billie's Bounce" – 4:02
 "Ko Ko" – 5:40
"Barbados"—4:09
 "Dewey Square" – 4:14
 "Moose the Mooche" – 3:37
 "Ornithology" (Benny Harris, Charlie Parker) – 5:06
 "Scrapple from the Apple" – 3:51
 "Salt Peanuts" (Dizzy Gillespie, Kenny Clarke) – 2:41
 "Big Foot" [short version] (aka "Drifting on a Reed") – 3:30

Personnel

Performance 
October 14, 1957, tracks 2-4, 6, 8, 11, 14. December 2, 1957, tracks 7, 12. January 30, 1958, tracks 1, 5, 9-10, 13, 15. New York.
 Bud Powell – piano
 George Duvivier – bass
 Art Taylor – drums

Production 
 Rudy Traylor – producer
 Michael Cuscuna – producer (1997 release)
 Malcolm Addey – mastering
 Ira Gitler – liner notes
 Francis Wolff – cover photo

References 

Bud Powell albums
1997 albums
Roulette Records albums
Blue Note Records albums
Albums produced by Michael Cuscuna